Edward C. Picken Sr. (June 13, 1907 – November 17, 1994) was an early American professional basketball player. He played in two games in the Eastern Basketball League for Camden Athletic Club during the 1931–32 season.

Picken attended Collingswood High School from 1922 to 1926, spent one college prep year at The Pennington School in 1926–27, and then matriculated at Dartmouth College in the fall of 1927. At Dartmouth he played for the basketball and baseball teams. His older brother, Jim Picken, also played numerous sports at Dartmouth, and the two of them were teammates for Camden during Eddie's two-game professional stint.

Beginning in 1931, Eddie served as basketball and baseball coach, athletic director, and schoolteacher at Troy High School in Troy, New York for 40 years. The school's hall of fame is named in his honor. He died on November 17, 1994, at the Mount Holly Center in Lumberton, New Jersey.

References

1907 births
1994 deaths
American men's basketball players
Schoolteachers from New York (state)
Basketball coaches from New Jersey
Basketball coaches from New York (state)
Basketball players from New Jersey
Collingswood High School alumni
Dartmouth Big Green baseball players
Dartmouth Big Green men's basketball players
High school baseball coaches in the United States
High school basketball coaches in New York (state)
High school football coaches in New York (state)
People from Collingswood, New Jersey
Sportspeople from Camden County, New Jersey
Sportspeople from Troy, New York
The Pennington School alumni